Pat Ford may refer to:

Sports
Pat Ford (boxer) (born 1931), Australian boxer
Pat Ford (ice hockey) (born 1964), Canadian ice hockey player and head coach

Others
Pat Ford, founder of WinCustomize
Pat Ford, musician in Colossal
Pat Ford, producer for The David Pakman Show

See also
Pat Forde, sports journalist
Patrick Ford (disambiguation)
Patricia Ford (disambiguation)